Peter Curtain (born 5 December 1962) is a former Australian rules footballer who played for St Kilda in the Victorian Football League (VFL) during the 1980s.

A premiership player at Old Xaverians in 1981, Curtain could only manage two appearances with St Kilda's seniors. He returned to Old Xavs after his VFL stint ended and won their 'Best and Fairest' in 1986, his first year as captain. Curtain remained captain until the end of the 1988 season and in the same year represented the Australian Amateurs team at the Adelaide Bicentennial Carnival.

References

Holmesby, Russell and Main, Jim (2007). The Encyclopedia of AFL Footballers. 7th ed. Melbourne: Bas Publishing.

1962 births
Living people
St Kilda Football Club players
Australian rules footballers from Victoria (Australia)
Old Xaverians Football Club players